The Journal of Conchology is a peer-reviewed scientific journal published by The Conchological Society of Great Britain and Ireland, covering research in conchology and malacology. It claims to be the world's oldest continuing publication on the subject.

The journal publishes original research and short communications on molluscs, with emphasis on conservation, biogeography and taxonomy. The contents include descriptions of new species from anywhere in the world, and reports concerning the ecology, distribution, and status of molluscs, both living and fossil.

References

External links 
 
 Digital archive of volumes 2–16 (1879–1922) in BHL

Malacology journals
English-language journals
Biannual journals
Publications established in 1879
Academic journals published by learned and professional societies